"Letters to You" is the second single released by Californian post-hardcore band Finch. It debuted at #39 in the UK, but fell out of the top 40 the following week.

Track listing

References

2003 singles
Songs written by Nate Barcalow
Finch (American band) songs